All the Colours of You is the 16th studio album by English rock band James. It was released on 4 June 2021, through Virgin Music Label & Artist Services. They had begun writing it prior to the release of their 15th studio album Living in Extraordinary Times (2018); they accumulated 100 jams. Due to the COVID-19 pandemic and the subsequent lockdowns, the members were stuck in different countries. Vocalist Tim Booth began working with producer Jacknife Lee at his studio in Topanga Canyon, California, where Booth acted as a liaison between the band and Lee. Described as a stadium rock and electronic album, its songs were influenced by the pandemic, the lockdowns, as well as the murder of George Floyd.

All the Colours of You received generally positive reviews from music critics, some of whom complimenting Lee's production, and noted its anthemic nature. It peaked at number three in the UK, while also charting in Germany, Ireland, Portugal, Scotland, and Switzerland. "All the Colours of You" was released as the lead single from the album on 1 March 2021, followed by three more singles – "Beautiful Beaches", "Recover", "Isabella" – over the course of the next two months. James played a handful of festivals in the United Kingdom in August and September 2021, before ending the year with a UK arena tour with Happy Mondays. A Portugal tour in April 2022 served as a prelude to more UK festivals throughout June 2022.

Background and writing
James released their 15th studio album Living in Extraordinary Times in August 2018. Two weeks prior to its release, the four songwriters in the band had gotten together to start writing the follow-up at a house in the Yorkshire Dales. Living in Extraordinary Times was promoted with tours in Australia, Europe (including a co-headlining United Kingdom tour with the Charlatans), New Zealand, South America, and the United States (a co-headlining tour with the Psychedelic Furs). The cycle saw the introduction of new member Deborah Knox-Hewson, who was subsequently replaced by her friend Chloe Alper.

In June 2019, bassist Jim Glennie said the band had another writing session left, before they intended to do any major editing, with the aiming of release an album in the next year. Booth said the band wanted to focus on more grooves, and explore other sounds they hadn't previously, such as contemporary psychedelia. By the outbreak of the COVID-19 pandemic, the band accumulated 100 jams, done across 17 days; they were halfway through an intended year-long break from touring. They spent sometime making demos and writing lyrics in preparation for their next album. Before the pandemic, the members would work on the demos in their own studios or meet up in pairs and work together for a few days. Due to the subsequent lockdowns, members of the band were separated in different countries. They would be on Zoom video calls, discussing how to continue working towards the new album.

Production
Booth, Glennie, keyboardist Mark Hunter, and Glennie's brother Peter did pre-production. James had planned to record their next album in the UK with Charlie Andrew, who had produced their previous album. After a member suggested working with Jacknife Lee, they learned he was living within two miles of vocalist Tim Booth in Topanga Canyon, California. Booth called Lee, before going to visit him where they talked and Booth showed him demos that he liked. Due to COVID-19 travel restrictions, Booth was the only member of James working in Lee's home studio. They did a trial session, where Lee made what would become the intro to "All the Colours of You". As the band loved it, Lee was enlisted as the producer for the rest of the album.

Lee, Matt Bishop and Hunter acted as engineers throughout the process, with editing by Bishop, and additional engineering from Beni Giles, Matthew Walsh, and Matt Glaseby. Lee was an experienced remixer that edited the band's demos, adding loops, providing electronic textures, and changing the structures. Booth served as an intermediary between the rest of the band and Lee; whenever they needed a part, such as a trumpet, he would contact trumpeter Andy Diagram, who would record it and send it to the pair. Lee mixed the recordings, before the album was mastered by John Davis at Metropolis in London.

Composition and lyrics
Musically, the sound of All the Colours of You has been described as stadium rock and electronic. QRO editor Ted Chase said James has the "emotional stadium size more akin to big eighties outfits from when they got their start, than either the slamming pop or intimate indie of today". Booth, who wrote the band's lyrics, cited the COVID-19 pandemic, the resulting lockdowns, as well as the murder of George Floyd, as influences on the topics covered on the album. All of the music was written between Booth, guitarist and violinist Saul Davies, Glennie, Hunter, and Lee. Drummer David Baynton-Power does not appear on the album, as his parts were played by Lee (the majority of the songs) or Bishop ("Beautiful Beaches" and "Wherever It Takes Us"). In addition to this, Lee contributed guitar and keyboards on every track, background vocals on five songs, and bass guitar on "Hush". Giles, who had worked on the previous album, did keyboards on "Zero" and "Beautiful Beaches". Peter Glennie sung background vocals on "Zero", played the EBow on "All the Colours of You", strings on "Magic Bus", and ello on "Isabella".

The album's opening track, "Zero", talks about death, and warns the listener to not fret about the time they have left. Its opening lyric "We're all going to die" was originally "We're all going to shine", which Booth changed due to COVID; he said in spite of the alteration, he "discovered the song was still uplifting". The slow-tempo electronic song starts with ambient sounds, prior to a gentle piano and guitar part guiding the rest of its runtime. "All the Colours of You" criticizes the presidency of Donald Trump, which Booth oversaw while living in the US; it was partially influenced by George Floyd protests. The song's mix of guitars and dance music earned it a comparison to the work of New Order, and to James' own "Ring the Bells" from their fourth studio album Seven (1992). "Recover" is a tribute Booth's father-in-law Saville Shela, who died as a result of COVID-19 in April 2020. Its minimalist instrumentations, as well as Booth's intimate vocals, were attributed to Lee's production style and earned a comparison to the work of Muse. Grace Galarraga of mxdwn felt that the track detailed the "middle part of quarantine, where people realized that 'nature needs a break' and people were all 'out of a job. "Beautiful Beaches" is a pop song about climate change; its outro features distorted drums similar to the ones heard in "It Might Be Time" (2019) by Tame Impala. It is inspired by a dream Booth had after meeting a Peruvian shaman, where he imagined earthquakes, fires, and "all hell breaking loose in California". The morning after the dream, a wildfire was blazing through California, which saw Booth and his family leave their home.

"Beautiful Beaches" transitions into "Wherever It Takes" with the aid of a synth bass. The latter track was born out of nightmares Booth was having about a friend of his that had gone to the George Floyd protests in Portland, Oregon. It is reminiscent of the band's Brian Eno-produced sixth album Wah Wah (1994), with ambient sounds, a pseudo-spoken word delivery from Booth, house piano, and a choir-led chorus. It saw comparison to "Once in a Lifetime" (1980) by Talking Heads with its sermon-esque vocal delivery and big chorus. "Hush" is about a ghost that haunts the person responsible for his death, though Booth said "the ghost isn’t really a malevolent ghost because he quite likes being dead, so he just keeps (the killer) awake by humming". It is techno-driven electronica track that evokes "Five O", a track from the band's fifth studio album Laid (1993). "Miss America" discusses the US, told from the viewpoint of a beauty pageant. Booth wanted the title to be multi-layered, referring to him leaving the country and to Trump hosting hosting pageants. Its middle portion consists of gunshots, screams and speeches from demonstrations. "Getting Myself Into" channelled the indie sound of the band's earliest material; "Magic Bus" is a dance-pop song. "Isabella" was the first song written for the album, and was originally known as "Yorkshire Day 1, Jam 2". Davies made a 15-minute demo of the jam, which confused the rest of the band members who felt it went on too long. The violin part in it was swapped for a choir section that featured Davies' children Mia and Vincent, as well as Bryony Ross. Booth said the track dealt with a person that is involved with a "freedom-loving lass" who ends up breaking up with them. The album's closing track, "XYST", opens with guitars in the vein of R.E.M., before giving way to electronic drums and Booth's slow vocal delivery. Feedback from the guitars increase leading into a group vocal-driven chorus, recalling Mylo Xyloto (2011)-era Coldplay.

Release
On 1 March 2021, All the Colours of You was announced for release in three months' time. Alongside this, "All the Colours of You" was released as its lead single. "Beautiful Beaches" was released as the album's second single on 19 April 2021. "Recover" was released as the album's third single on 5 May 2021. "Isabella" was released as the album's fourth single on 19 May 2021. All the Colours of You was released on 4 June 2021, through Virgin Music Label & Artist Services; the digital deluxe edition included demos of "Where It Takes Us", "Life", and "Isabella", as well as live renditions of "Beautiful Beachers" and "Getting Myself Into". Multi-instrumentalist Saul Davies theorised that the album would've likely been released several months earlier, back in February, had it not been affected by the pandemic. On the same day, the band did a radio session for Absolute Radio, where they played "All the Colours of You", "Beautiful Beaches", and "Getting Myself Into".

A music video was released for "Getting Myself Into" on 7 June 2021, directed by Mark Oulson-Jenkins.  It was filmed at the Broughton Hall Estate, and was the first video to feature the entire band since 1999. Booth and his wife were friends with the owners of the Hall, Roger Tempest and Paris Ackrill. Booth had told them the band were going to rehearse in a studio in London, until Tempest suggested his house. Knox-Hewson returned to the band, expanding them to a nine-piece, leading up to the album's touring cycle. Following a one-off show in Oxford, James performed at a variety of UK festivals in August and September 2021, including Beautiful Days, Isle of Wight and Playground. In November 2021, the band released The Campfire EP, a four-track release featuring reimagined versions of "Recover", "Miss America" and "Magic Bus", recorded at the Stately Home, located in the Yorkshire Dales. James then embarked on an arena tour of the UK with Happy Mondays in November and December 2021. Preceded by a tour of Portugal in April 2022, the band played various festival and standalone shows in the UK in June 2022, leading up to a performance at the Castlefield Bowl in Castlefield. Several festivals across Europe followed, ending with an appearance at the Visor Fest in Spain in September 2022.

Reception

All the Colours of You was met with generally favourable reviews from music critics. AnyDecentMusic? gave it a score of 6.9, based on 10 reviews.

Louder Than War writer Iain Key complimented Lee's "polished, but not superficial, cinematic and turned up to 11" production style. Mojo John Aizlewood also praised Lee's ability, giving "these big songs the big production they need." The Arts Desk journalist Nick Hasted saw Lee's "sleek burnishing and mild deconstruction" production as "help[ing] James still sound big if not exactly contemporary." God Is in the TV contributor Laura Dean highlighted Hunter's "influence and talent [as] shin[ing] brightly throughout the entirety of the album." In lieu of the way it was recorded, she liked that the band managed to make "a solid album that reflects the talents of each member" while "continually experimenting with their sound and always challenging both themselves and their fans."

Emma Harrison of Clash wrote that the album "might just be their strongest offering to date", explaining that there were glimmers of James' old sound "in parts" as it "takes the band into a new sonic adventure where you hear lo-if leanings and pumping club beats." Key noted that the in spite of the band's longevity, "it's unmistakably still James [...] sound[ing] bigger than anything that's come before." Under the Radar Matt Raven wrote that the album was a "super satisfying musical experience that solidifies an illustrious 35-year career [...] making a distinctive brand of creative rock music with rich textures and shrewd melodies." Andrew Mueller of Uncut saw the album as a "winning synthesis of James' anthemic tendencies and their instinctive weirdness", acting as "mostly another step in the group's restless quest for joy and solidarity." musicOMH contributor John Murphy said the album was "very much in that James vein – full of stirring anthems that you can imagine being belted out in the arenas of the country", with a "freshness" about it that their peers lack. Aside from song of the album's weaker songs towards its end, he noted the "energy and way with a chorus that would shame bands half their age."

Record Collector reviewer Kevin Harley noted that the album harkened to the band's past "only to channel their founding exploratory impetus into exultant, reflective and wide-ranging new shapes." He added that it was "[b]oth an album for today and a testimony to their formative drive, [as] it silences any fear that James might be losing altitude." PopMatters writer Gary Schwind saw it as a "complex album" that wasn't "easy to classify." He explained that while some tracks would work in the film soundtrack, there was "no song you find yourself singing after you've listened to the album a couple of times." Gigwise Tom Dibb wrote that the band were "woefully out of step" with the album, as its musical palette comes across as "seeming[ly] muddled and confused in today’s modern musical landscape." He added that it "fails to hit the mark [...] already sound[ing] dated and misguided."

All the Colours of You appeared at number two in the UK Albums Midweek Chart, selling 9,817 copies, eventually landing at number three on the main UK Albums Chart. It also charted at number two in Scotland, number eight in Portugal, number 66 in Switzerland, number 83 in Ireland, and number 98 in Germany.

Track listing
All lyrics by Tim Booth, all music written by Booth, Saul Davies, Jim Glennie, Mark Hunter, and Jacknife Lee. All recordings produced by Lee.

"Zero" – 5:42
"All the Colours of You" – 5:26
"Recover" – 3:44
"Beautiful Beaches" – 5:14
"Wherever It Takes Us" – 5:05
"Hush" – 4:23
"Miss America" – 4:02
"Getting Myself Into" – 3:27
"Magic Bus" – 3:01
"Isabella" – 4:23
"XYST" – 4:37

Personnel
Personnel per booklet.

James
 Tim Booth – lead vocals, background vocals (tracks 1, 2 and 6–11)
 Jim Glennie – bass guitar (tracks 1–5 and 7–10), background vocals (track 5)
 Saul Davies – guitar (all except track 3), violin (tracks 3, 6, 7 and 10), background vocals (tracks 5 and 10)
 Mark Hunter – keyboards, background vocals (track 5)
 Andy Diagram – trumpet (tracks 1–3 and 7), background vocals (track 5), horns (track 10)
 Adrian Oxaal – guitar (tracks 1, 10 and 11), background vocals (tracks 5)
 Chloe Alper – background vocals (tracks 2, 4, 5, 7 and 9–11)

Additional musicians
 Jacknife Lee – guitar, keyboards, drums (tracks 1–3 and 6–11), background vocals (tracks 2, 3, 5, 7 and 11), bass guitar (track 6), programming
 Beni Giles – keyboards (tracks 1 and 4)
 Peter Glennie – background vocals (track 1), EBow (track 2), strings (track 9), cellos (track 10)
 Collette Byrn – background vocals (track 1)
 Matt Bishop – drums (tracks 4 and 5)
 Kate Shela – background vocals (track 4)
 Mia Davies – background vocals (tracks 9 and 10)
 Vincent Davies – background vocals (track 10)
 Bryony Ross – background vocals (track 10)

Production and design
 Jacknife Lee – producer, mixing, engineer
 Matt Bishop – engineer, editing
 Mark Hunter – engineer, pre-production
 Tim Booth – production overseer, pre-production
 Jim Glennie – pre-production
 Peter Glennie – pre-production
 Beni Giles – additional engineering
 Matthew Walsh – additional engineering
 Matt Glaseby – additional engineering
 John Davis – mastering
 Matt de Jong – visual creative direction
 Jamie-James Medina – visual creative direction

Charts

References
Citations

Sources

External links

All the Colours of You at YouTube (streamed copy where licensed)
 Interview with Saul Davies at UK Music Reviews
 Interview with Tim Booth at The Art of Longevity (podcast) – via Buzzsprout

2021 albums
James (band) albums
Albums produced by Jacknife Lee